The Southern Red Sea Region is an administrative region of Eritrea. It lies along the southern half of the Red Sea, and contains the coastal city of Assab.

As of 2005, the region had a population of 83,500 compared to a population of 73,700 in 2001. The net growth rate was 11.74 per cent. The total area of the province was 27600.00 km2 and the density was 3.03 persons per km2.

Geography

Forming the major part of the Danakil Desert, its major towns include Asseb, Beilul, Rahaita and T'i'o. The highest point in this region is Mount Ramlu. It is generally considered one of the hottest, driest and most inhospitable regions in the country. The topography of the region has coastal plains, which are hotter than the regions around the highland plateau. There are two rainy seasons, the heavier one during summer and the lighter one during spring. The climate and geography of the region along with other regions of Eritrea is similar to the one of Ethiopia.

Wildlife such as hamadryas baboons, Soemmerring's gazelle, dorcas gazelle, warthog, black-backed jackal, Ruppells sandfox, dikdik, African golden wolf, hyena, Abyssinian hare, wild ass and ostriches are found in this region. African wild dog was also found in this region, but their present condition is unknown. There have been reports of cheetah occurring in this region, but there has been no evidence of their presence. It is extremely likely that both cheetah and wild dog are extinct in Eritrea.

Demographics
As of 2005, the region had a population of 83,500 compared to a population of 73,700 in 2001. The net growth rate was 11.74 per cent. The total area of the province was 27600.00 km2 and the density was 3.03 persons per km2. As of 2002, the Total Fertility Rate (TFR), defined as the children per woman was 3.9. The General Fertility Rate (GFR), defined as the births per 1,000 women between the ages of 15 and 45 remained at 135.0. The Crude Birth Rate (CBR), the number of births per 1,000 population, was 34.0. The percentage of women pregnant as of 2002 out of the total population was 8.9 per cent. The mean number of children ever born stood at 5.1. The Infant Mortality Rate (IMR), defined as the number of deaths of children for every 1,000 born was 122.0 while the Child Mortality Rate (CMR), defined as the number of child deaths for every 1,000 children 5 years of age was 74.0. The under-5 mortality rate stood at 187.0. The number of children with the prevalence of Acute Respiratory Infection (ARI) was 174, fever was 174, and Diarrhea was 174. The number of women with the knowledge of AIDS was 324 and the number of people with no knowledge of the disease or its prevention was 0.2 per cent.

Education and economy

As of 2002, the number of males completing or attending highest level of schooling in the region was 410 while it was 567 females. The percentage of literate males was 60.00 and the percentage of literate females was 41.60. A fraction of 37.60 males had no education, while the corresponding number for females was 54.80. The fraction of males completing secondary school stood at 8.40 and the fraction of males completing more than secondary was 003. The corresponding numbers for females was 4.10 and 000 respectively.

As of 2002, the number of people engaged in Professional/technical/managerial activities was 3.30 per cent, Clerical was 9.30 per cent, Sales and services was 21.10 per cent, Skilled Manual was 4.50 per cent, Unskilled Manual was 0.50 per cent, Domestic Service was 25.00 per cent and Agriculture was 34.60 per cent. The total number of employed men was 345 and the total number of employed women was 409. The number of men who were paid their total earnings in cash was 77.70 per cent, in kind was 0.10 and in both was 0.20. The number of women who were paid their total earnings in cash was 58.80 per cent, in kind was 0.60 per cent and in both was 0.30 per cent.

Administration
The region also includes the following districts: Are'eta District, Central Denkalya District and Southern Denkalya District. Eritrea has a one party national Assembly governed by People’s Front for Democracy and Justice (PFDJ) (originally Eritrean Liberation Front), an authoritarian government. From the time of independence since 30 May 1991, the country has been continuing with a transitional government elected during the elections in April 1993. The scheduled elections in 2001 has been postponed indefinitely. The regional and local elections are conducted on a periodic basis on a restricted framework. All men and women of any ethnic or religious background are eligible to vote. No parties or groups other than PFDJ are allowed to contest and the elections are presided by representatives from PDFJ. Policy decisions should be centered around the party mandate and opposition and dissenters have been imprisoned.

References

External links
Regions of Eritrea

 
Regions of Eritrea
Red Sea
States and territories established in 1996